Simone St. James is a Canadian author of mystery, historical fiction, and romance novels.

Selected texts

The Book of Cold Cases (2022) 
The Book of Cold Cases, expected to be published March 15, 2022 by Berkley Books, is a thriller novel with two intersecting timelines (2017 and 1977) in Oregon.

The book received a positive review from Publishers Weekly, and Goodreads named it one of the most anticipated books of 2022.

The Sun Down Motel (2020) 
The Sun Down Motel, published February 18, 2020 by Berkley Books, is a mystery thriller novel set in 1982 New York. It was a New York Times best seller.

The book received a starred review from Booklist, as well as a positive review from Publishers Weekly.

It also received the following accolades:

 Goodreads Choice Award for Mystery & Thriller nominee (2020)
 Ladies of Horror Fiction Award for Best Novel nominee (2020)

The Broken Girls (2018) 
The Broken Girls, published March 20, 2018 by Berkley Books, is a mystery novel set with two intertwined timelines in Vermont (1950 and 2014).

The book received a starred review from Booklist, as well as a positive review from Publishers Weekly.

It was nominated for a Goodreads Choice Award for Mystery & Thriller (2018).

Silence for the Dead (2014) 
Silence for the Dead, published December 1, 2014 by Thorndike Press, is a mystery novel set in 1919 England.

The book received a positive review from Publishers Weekly and was nominated for Goodreads Choice Award for Horror (2014).

The Haunting of Maddy Clare (2012) 
The Haunting of Maddy Clare, published March 6, 2012 by Berkley Books, is a mystery novel with paranormal and romance elements.

The book received a positive review from Publishers Weekly and Kirkus, as well as the following accolades:

 RITA Award by Romance Writers of America for Best First Book (2013)
 RITA Award by Romance Writers of America for Best Novel with Strong Romantic Elements (2013)
 Arthur Ellis Award for Best First Crime Novel (2013)

Publications 

 The Book of Cold Cases (2022)
 The Sun Down Motel (2020)
 The Broken Girls (2018)
 Lost Among the Living (2016)
 The Other Side of Midnight (2015)
 Silence for the Dead (2014)
 An Inquiry Into Love and Death (2013)
 The Haunting of Maddy Clare (2012)

References

External links 

 Official website

Living people
Writers from Toronto
Date of birth missing (living people)
Canadian women novelists
21st-century Canadian novelists
Canadian historical novelists
Canadian romantic fiction writers
Canadian mystery writers
Women mystery writers
Women historical novelists
Women romantic fiction writers
Year of birth missing (living people)